Teatro Vivo is a site specific theatre company formed in south London, England, in 2005 by theatre director Sophie Austin. The company has expanded from its London base and performed shows in Oxford, Berkshire, Devon and Dorset as well as maintaining a strong presence in London. It creates both new work and adaptations with an element of audience participation, in non-theatre spaces and outdoor venues.

Major works by the company include The Odyssey (2012) on the streets of Deptford, London; Supermarket Shakespeare (2008–10), a series of stories based on Shakespeare plays in Sainsbury's supermarkets across London and Here But There, a retelling of Anton Chekhov's Three Sisters (2006/7) in the now defunct Theatre Museum in Covent Garden. Lyn Gardner writing in The Guardian described the production of Adventures in Wonderland (2013) as "full of raggle-taggle invention, and its cleverness lies in the way it casts the audience as co-conspirators."

Theatre writer Sarah Sigal says Teatro Vivo is an ensemble "focussed on the centrality of the actor/performer's contribution to the process of theatre making and a kind of collaboration wherein all company members make significant contributions to the process."

The Guardian, in an editorial on the company's work said: Almost anywhere is a possible stage for this most creative of theatre groups. The challenge they set themselves is to break free of tradition, reinterpret the classics and collaborate with their often youthful audience. It is a conspiracy to entertain and provoke that invites the onlooker to be co-conspirator. Absolutely not the West End. Take a raincoat.

Overview 
Theatre director Sophie Austin formed the company immediately after graduating from the B.A in Theatre Directing Course at Rose Bruford College, London: "My aim was to create theatre with like minded creatives who enjoyed making work for a new audiences. I had no money for rehearsal space or theatre hire so we had our first meeting in a café and staged our first play in a park. What started out as a budgetary constraint became a central ethos for the company. By performing in these public spaces we were able to reach a really diverse audience and by collaborating with these spaces to tell a story, we were challenged and inspired in equal measure."

Austin's key collaborators since the first production have been Mark Stevenson, who responded to an advert placed in local arts venues in Lewisham, where Austin lived, Laura Hooper and Kas Darley.

The company have formed working partnerships with The Albany Theatre, Deptford, with whom they are an associate company, Greenwich and Lewisham Young People’s Theatre (GLYPT), and Dash Arts.

Austin stepped down as artistic director in July 2019, with Stevenson and Darley becoming joint artistic directors.

In response to lockdown restrictions imposed as a result of the COVID 19 pandemic in 2020 the company put on a special set of online performances of their show the Grimms Collecting Agency, in which they advertised for people to be interviewed. The ‘Grimms’ met people on Zoom and listened to their stories about life under lockdown. This was the first time the company had produced a filmic piece.

In June 2021 the company staged their first production in Dorset, an adaptation of the legend of Ondine at St Catherine's Chapel in Abbotsbury.

In 2021 Teatro Vivo created The Regulars in collaboration with the INN CROWD, a show specifically designed for performance in pubs through 2021 and 2022. There were performances in Dorset and Somerset, and for the first time the company performed in the north of England, in Preston and Blackburn, Lancashire. 

On March 18, 2022, Teatro Vivo were announced as Artists of Change alongside Dima Karout. Artists of Change is a new programme of arts residencies, developed in collaboration with Lewisham Council, for its tenure as Borough of Culture.

Selected productions

References

Theatre companies in London
Site-specific theatre
2005 establishments in England